Ewart Gladstone "Dixie" Walker (June 1, 1887 – November 14, 1965), was a Major League Baseball pitcher who played from  to  with the Washington Senators. He batted left and threw right-handed. Walker had a 25–31 record in 74 career games.

He was born in Brownsville, Pennsylvania, and died in Leeds, Alabama. He is buried in Birmingham's Elmwood Cemetery.

Walker was the brother of Major Leaguer Ernie Walker, and the father of Major Leaguers Dixie Walker and Harry Walker.

References

External links

 

1887 births
1965 deaths
Albany Senators players
Baltimore Orioles (IL) players
Baseball players from Pennsylvania
Burials at Elmwood Cemetery (Birmingham, Alabama)
Major League Baseball pitchers
Milwaukee Brewers (minor league) players
Minor league baseball managers
People from Fayette County, Pennsylvania
Reading Pretzels players
St. Paul Apostles players
St. Paul Saints (AA) players
Utica Utes players
Washington Senators (1901–1960) players